Cameron Andrew George Heeps (born 27 October 1995) is an Australian speedway rider.

Career
He began his British career riding for the Mildenhall Fen Tigers in 2011, winning the Knockout Cup. Heeps joined Ipswich Witches in 2012 and has appeared for them during most of the next ten seasons. In between he had spells at Rye House Rockets during the 2016 Premier League speedway season, the Somerset Rebels and Wolverhampton Wolves. In 2019, he had a season with the Edinburgh Monarchs.

In 2021 he rode for Ipswich and Kent. In 2022, he rode for the Ipswich Witches in the SGB Premiership 2022 and the Oxford Cheetahs in the SGB Championship 2022. The Cheetahs were returning to action after a 14-year absence from British Speedway.

In 2023, he re-signed for Oxford Cheetahs for the SGB Championship 2023.

References 

1995 births
Living people
Australian speedway riders
Edinburgh Monarchs riders
Ipswich Witches riders
Kent Kings riders
Mildenhall Fen Tigers riders
Oxford Cheetahs riders
Rye House Rockets riders
Somerset Rebels riders
Wolverhampton Wolves riders